Cullen Sheehan is a registered  lobbyist for Lockridge Grindal Nauen P.L.L.P. He previously served as Chief of Staff of the Minnesota Senate Republican Caucus from January 2010 to November 2011. Sheehan also worked with the U.S. Senate campaigns of Norm Coleman in 2002 and 2008, where Sheehan served as campaign manager.

References

1975 births
Living people
American lobbyists
Saint Mary's University of Minnesota alumni